Abu ol Mehdi (also Romanized as Abū ol Mehdī) is a village in Kamin Rural District, in the Central District of Pasargad County, Fars Province, Iran. At the 2006 census, its population was 131, in 32 families.

References 

Populated places in Pasargad County